Father Ignatius Krekshino (Russian: Игнатий Крекшин, born in 1956) is a Russian Greek-Catholic priest and Father Superior.

Biography

Krekshino graduated from the Department of Art and History Faculty of Moscow State University and the Moscow Orthodox Theological Seminary. On 5 November 1989 he was ordained to the priesthood by Bishop Gregory (Chirkov) of Mozhaisk.

He served as rector of the Nativity Bobreneva monastery. Krekshino was also a supporter of the introduction of the Russian language in the liturgy, and signed a Message from the 10 April 1994, calling for a discussion of the liturgical order. Prior to 1998, was secretary of the Commission for the canonization and a member of the Theological Commission of the Holy Synod. In 1998, the decision of the Holy Synod had granted a petition for dismissal of the rector of Nativity Bobreneva monastery due to deduction for health reasons. Since 1999 he has been a convert to Catholicism and has served in the Greek-Catholic Church of Saint Nicholas in Munich and after in the Catholic church of Saint Procopius in Tübingen. He graduated from Munich School of Philosophy.

Works
 The Gospel of Luke with explanations. // Moscow Diocesan Gazette. Moscow, 1991. N 1. S. 38-43.
 The word after Vespers in the Cathedral of Vladimir May 21, 1991 // Orthodox community number 19.
 О наших публикациях, Предисл. к статье еп. Кассиана (Безобразова) "Принципы православного толкования слова Божия" // Альфа и Омега. М.,  1994. №2 (АиО). стр. 28. 
 In memory of Fr. Sergius Gakkel // Herald RHD. Paris: № 189. I. 2005.
 My memory of Alexander. The meeting, which continues / / Truth and the Life. 1/2005.

Sources

Alexei Bukalov. Prayer of the seven gods to seventy languages / / Today. 1996. October 9

A. Clement. Difficulties and ailments Russian Church / / Russian thought. 1998. June 18–24

References

External links
 http://antimodern.wordpress.com/2009/02/17/крекшин-андрей-николаевич-бывш-игуме/
 http://zarubezhje.narod.ru/gi/i_041.htm
 http://www.srcc.msu.su/bib_roc/bib/Authors15.htm#42394

Converts to Eastern Catholicism from Eastern Orthodoxy
Former Russian Orthodox Christians
Russian Eastern Catholics
1956 births
Living people